Jeremy Duns (born 10 December 1973) is a British author of spy fiction and the history of espionage. Born in Manchester, he now resides in Åland.

Life and career
Duns studied at St Catherine's College, Oxford, after which he worked for several years as a journalist at the Brussels-based magazine The Bulletin. In Britain he has written for The Sunday Times, The Daily Telegraph and The Independent newspapers. He is an admirer of Ian Fleming and James Bond, and has unearthed pages of a lost Bond novel, Per Fine Ounce, early screenplays for Casino Royale and The Diamond Smugglers, and researched a wartime MI6 operation that inspired the opening of the film Goldfinger.

Duns writes spy fiction featuring an MI6 agent called Paul Dark, set during the Cold War. Duns's novels are influenced by Fleming, Len Deighton and John le Carré; his debut novel, Free Agent (2009), was one of the Telegraphs "thrillers of the year" in 2009. The BBC optioned the television rights to the Paul Dark series in 2009, although Duns' own website notes that the option has since lapsed.

Duns is a member of International Thriller Writers and the Crime Writers' Association. He lived in Stockholm, Sweden from 2004, and subsequently moved to Åland.

Stance on plagiarism and sockpuppetry
Duns has criticised other authors for plagiarism. In 2011, he praised the debut spy novel Assassin of Secrets by Q.R. Markham, but after reading allegations that a scene in the novel was plagiarised, Duns investigated and discovered that large sections of the novel had been copied. He informed the British publisher Hodder, and the book was pulled by Hodder and U.S. publisher Little, Brown and Company.

In 2012, he discovered that the novelist R. J. Ellory had written positive reviews of his own books while responding negatively to rivals, on the Amazon website through the use of sockpuppets. Ellory admitted he had done this, and apologised for it. Duns has also examined methods used by British author Stephen Leather since his admission in 2012 that he uses a network of sockpuppets to promote his own work online. Duns has also alleged that Leather has harassed him online in retaliation.

In 2012, Duns helped organise an open letter signed by over 50 authors condemning the use by certain authors of sockpuppets, fake reviews and other deceptive marketing techniques.

Bibliography
Free Agent (2009) 
 Song of Treason (2010) 
 The Moscow Option (2012) 
 The Dark Chronicles: A Spy Trilogy (2012) 
 Dead Drop: The True Story of Oleg Penkovsky and the Cold War's Most Dangerous Operation (2013) 
 News of Devils: The Media and Edward Snowden (2014)

References

External links

1973 births
Living people
British expatriates in Finland
British writers
Alumni of St Catherine's College, Oxford